Paolo Cimpiel (born 12 June 1940) is an Italian retired footballer who played as a goalkeeper.

In 1977, he played in the National Soccer League with Toronto Italia.

References

1940 births
Living people
Italian footballers
People from the Province of Pordenone
Association football goalkeepers
Bologna F.C. 1909 players
Trapani Calcio players
Brescia Calcio players
Hellas Verona F.C. players
U.S. Catanzaro 1929 players
A.C. Cesena players
Taranto F.C. 1927 players
Delfino Pescara 1936 players
S.S. Chieti Calcio players
Toronto Blizzard (1971–1984) players
Toronto Italia players
Serie A players
Serie B players
Serie C players
North American Soccer League (1968–1984) players
Canadian National Soccer League players
Italian expatriate footballers
Expatriate soccer players in Canada
Italian expatriate sportspeople in Canada
Footballers from Friuli Venezia Giulia